Travis Ewanyk (born March 29, 1993) is a Canadian professional ice hockey centre currently playing for Eispiraten Crimmitschau of the DEL2.

Playing career
Before turning professional, Ewanyk played in the junior Western Hockey League with Edmonton Oil Kings. He was drafted 74th overall by the Edmonton Oilers in the 2011 NHL Entry Draft after his second season with the Oil Kings. He played two more seasons for the Oil Kings before signing a three-year entry level contract with the Oilers.

Ewanyk spent two seasons with the Oilers' American Hockey League affiliate the Oklahoma City Barons before he was traded to the Ottawa Senators for Eric Gryba. He spent just one season with the Senators' AHL affiliate the Binghamton Senators before becoming a free agent. With no NHL interest, Ewanyk signed for the Idaho Steelheads of the ECHL on October 12, 2016. He also played one game for the AHL's Texas Stars during the 2016-17 season. He also had spells with the Fort Wayne Komets and the Wichita Thunder.

On August 29, 2018, Ewanyk moved to Europe and signed with the Krefeld Pinguine of the Deutsche Eishockey Liga (DEL). He signed a new one-year contract with Krefeld on April 3, 2019.

References

External links

1993 births
Living people
Binghamton Senators players
Canadian ice hockey centres
Edmonton Oil Kings players
Edmonton Oilers draft picks
ETC Crimmitschau players
Fort Wayne Komets players
Ice hockey people from Alberta
Idaho Steelheads (ECHL) players
Krefeld Pinguine players
Oklahoma City Barons players
Sportspeople from St. Albert, Alberta
Texas Stars players
Wichita Thunder players